John W. Hancock (April 13, 1901 – 1993) was an American football player, track and field athlete, coach of football, basketball, track, and wrestling, and college athletics administrator.  He played college football at the University of Iowa.

Playing career
Hancock played football at the University of Iowa from 1922 to 1924.  He played a significant role on Iowa’s 1922 Big Ten Conference championship team.  As a senior, Hancock played both the tackle and end positions and kicked five field goals for the Hawkeyes.  He was named all-Big Ten and a second team All-American after the 1924 season.  He also won three letters in track with the Hawkeyes, capturing a title in the discus event at the 1925 Big Ten championships.

Coaching career
Hancock went into college coaching after graduation.  He coached football at Mississippi State University for three years from 1927 to 1929. While working as an assistant at Marquette University, Hancock served as head coach of the ice hockey team for two seasons. He went to the University of Northern Colorado in 1932 and began a long coaching career.  Hancock served as their athletic director for 34 years and coached football and track for decades as well.

Hancock was the head football coach at Northern Colorado for 20 seasons, from 1932 until 1953.  His football coaching record at Northern Colorado was 75–78–5.  In 1950, he led his team to the Bean Bowl.

Hancock is best known as a college wrestling coach at Northern Colorado.  He originated the Mountain Intercollegiate Wrestling Association and proceeded to lead UNC to 30 consecutive conference championships.  He served on the NCAA rules committee for 16 years and chaired it in 1962–63.

Hancock has been nicknamed “the father of Colorado high school wrestling”.  He helped start the Colorado High School Wrestling Tournament in Greeley in 1936 by going door-to-door in the community to find families that could house the visiting high school wrestlers.  Two of his sons became well-known wrestling coaches as well.

Honors
Hancock was inducted into the National Wrestling Hall of Fame in 1998.  The Butler–Hancock Sports Pavilion at the University of Northern Colorado was named in honor of Hancock and Pete Butler, baseball coach.

Head coaching record

Football

Ice hockey

References

1901 births
1993 deaths
American football ends
American football tackles
Iowa Hawkeyes football players
Iowa Hawkeyes men's track and field athletes
Marquette Golden Avalanche football coaches
Marquette Golden Eagles men's ice hockey coaches
Mississippi State Bulldogs football coaches
Northern Colorado Bears athletic directors
Northern Colorado Bears football coaches
Northern Colorado Bears men's basketball coaches
Northern Colorado Bears track and field coaches
Northern Colorado Bears wrestling coaches
People from Marshfield, Wisconsin
Coaches of American football from Wisconsin
Players of American football from Wisconsin
Basketball coaches from Wisconsin